The Departed may refer to:

The Departed, a 2006 film directed by Martin Scorsese
"The Departed" (The Green Green Grass), an episode of the television series The Green Green Grass
The Departed: A Novel, by Kathy Mackel
"The Departed" (The Vampire Diaries), an episode of the television series The Vampire Diaries
The Departed (band), a red dirt/southern rock band from Oklahoma